Tasbih Kola (also Romanized as Tasbīḩ Kolā) is a village in Mianrud Rural District, Chamestan District, Nur County, Mazandaran Province, Iran. At the 2006 census, its population was 329, in 75 families.

References 

Populated places in Nur County